Claysville is an unincorporated community in Guernsey County, in the U.S. state of Ohio.

History
Claysville was platted in 1828 on the Clay Pike, from which the community took its name. A post office called Claysville has been in operation since 1830.

References

Unincorporated communities in Guernsey County, Ohio
Unincorporated communities in Ohio